Ancistrocladus heyneanus or Kardal is a liana endemic to the Western Ghats of southwestern India. Leaves are alternate, oblong in shape, 10-25 cm long, margins are entire.

References

External links
 About Medicinal research
 About Medicinal research
 Details about the plant
 https://www.lap-publishing.com/catalog/details/store/gb/book/978-3-8473-0181-3/betulinic-acid-from-ancistrocladus-heyneanus-wall-ex-grah

Ancistrocladaceae
Endemic flora of India (region)
Plants described in 1839